Rodrigue Akpakoun (born 16 December 1974) is a Beninese former professional footballer who played as a striker.

Career
Akpakoun played several seasons in the lower tiers of French football, including spells at Stade de Reims and La Roche VF.

Akpakoun was part of the Beninese 2004 African Nations Cup team which finished bottom of its group in the first round of competition, thus failing to secure qualification for the quarter-finals.

References

External links

1974 births
Living people
People from Cotonou
Association football forwards
Beninese footballers
Benin international footballers
Beninese expatriate sportspeople in France
Beninese expatriate footballers
Stade Beaucairois players
FC Sète 34 players
Olympique Alès players
La Roche VF players
FC Martigues players
2004 African Cup of Nations players